Robert Lewis Cattage (born August 17, 1958) is a retired American basketball player.

Early years
Born in Huntsville, Alabama, Cattage played basketball for Ed White Junior High and J.O. Johnson High School.

He played collegiately for Auburn University. On April 13, 1980, Cattage's appendix burst. He was hospitalized and required six operations, lost more than 40 pounds, and spent 59 days in the intensive care unit before returning to Auburn for his junior year.

Pro career
He was selected by the Utah Jazz in the eighth round (165th pick overall) of the 1981 NBA Draft.

He played for the Jazz (1981–82) and the New Jersey Nets (1985–86) in the NBA for a total of 78 games. In his only season with the Nets he earned a reported salary of $75,000. He was briefly signed by the Detroit Pistons but was cut in October 1984 before playing any games for the team.

He played for several teams in the Continental Basketball Association, including the Billings Volcanos.

Awards and honors
In 2010, he was selected to the 1970s all-decade team of Madison County, Alabama, high school basketball players by Huntsville Times.

References

External links

NBA Player Info Page - Bobby Cattage

1958 births
Living people
Albuquerque Silvers players
American expatriate basketball people in Canada
American expatriate basketball people in Italy
American men's basketball players
Auburn Tigers men's basketball players
Basketball players from Alabama
Billings Volcanos players
New Jersey Nets players
Parade High School All-Americans (boys' basketball)
Power forwards (basketball)
Sportspeople from Huntsville, Alabama
Toronto Tornados players
Utah Jazz draft picks
Utah Jazz players